To Rome with Love is an American sitcom that aired on CBS from September 28, 1969, to February 24, 1971.

Synopsis
To Rome with Love is the story of widowed college professor Michael Endicott, who decided to leave his native Iowa following the death of his wife and accept a new position as an instructor at the American Overseas School of Rome. The culture shock of his children in reacting to their new environment, and to an extent, his own, provided the main humor in the series. Family situations provided most of the rest. Early on, much of this came from Endicott's single sister, Harriet, who followed them to Rome, apparently for the sole purposes of dissuading them from living there and to cajole them into returning to Iowa. Harriet soon departed, but her place was taken shortly afterward by Andy Pruitt, Endicott's father-in-law and the children's grandfather. He came to Rome for a brief visit, but wound up staying indefinitely.

Broadcast history

Episode list

Season 1: 1969–70

Season 2: 1970–71

Reception
Originally airing on Sunday nights, the show went up against ABC's Land of the Giants and NBC's The Wonderful World of Disney and never garnered the ratings CBS had hoped for. Also, Kay Medford as Aunt Harriet did not catch on with viewers and, as a result, was phased out of the series shortly after its premiere. Nevertheless, the network agreed to renew the show for a second season. To Rome With Love was switched to Tuesdays at 9:30 in September, 1970.

In order to give Forsythe a strong co-star, Walter Brennan joined the cast as Michael Endicott's father-in-law, Andy Pruitt. However, the second season did even worse than the first. In January, 1971, in an attempt to salvage the series, CBS shifted the show to Wednesdays to make room for a new CBS sitcom: All In The Family. The move did not help, and the series was canceled in the spring of 1971.

Crossover episodes
"Roman Affair" (Season 2, Episode 4) features Anissa Jones and Johnnie Whitaker as their Family Affair characters Buffy and Jody, respectively. "Rome Is Where You Find It" (Season 2, Episode 6) features William Demarest, Don Grady and Tina Cole as Uncle Charley, Robbie Douglas and Katie Douglas respectively from My Three Sons.

Cast
John Forsythe as Michael Endicott
Kay Medford as Harriet Endicott (first season only)
Walter Brennan as Andy Pruitt (second season only)
Peggy Mondo as Mama Vitale
Vito Scotti as Nico
Joyce Menges as Alison Endicott
Susan Neher as Penny Endicott
Melanie Fullerton as Mary Jane "Pokey" Endicott

References
Brooks, Tim and Marsh, Earle, The Complete Directory to Prime Time Network and Cable TV Shows

External links
 
 To Rome With Love opening credits on YouTube

1969 American television series debuts
1971 American television series endings
1960s American sitcoms
1970s American sitcoms
CBS original programming
English-language television shows
Television series by Sony Pictures Television
Television shows set in Rome